Bryotropha senectella is a moth of the family Gelechiidae. It is found throughout Europe.

The wingspan is 9–13 mm. The forewings are brown, mottled with yellow to greyish ochreous. The hindwings are pale grey, slightly darker towards the apex. Adults have been recorded on wing from June to early September.

Larvae live in silken tubes among Homalothecium lutescens growing on the ground or on low rocks, or among Bryum species growing on walls. The larvae have a dull purplish or reddish brown body and blackish brown head.

References

Moths described in 1839
senectella
Moths of Europe